Stich Peak is a peak, 2,305 m, on the west side of Reedy Glacier, standing between May Peak and Chapin Peak in the Quartz Hills. Mapped by United States Geological Survey (USGS) from surveys and U.S. Navy air photos, 1960–64. Named by Advisory Committee on Antarctic Names (US-ACAN) for Lieutenant Commander John D. Stich, U.S. Navy, pilot at McMurdo Station during 1962-63 and 1963–64.

Mountains of Marie Byrd Land